Alejandro Scopelli Casanova (12 May 1908 – 23 October 1987) was an Italian Argentine football player and coach. A striker, he played for Argentina between 1929 and 1941, and competed at the inaugural 1930 FIFA World Cup. He also represented the Italy national football team on one occasion.

Playing career
Born in La Plata, Scopelli started his career in Argentina with Estudiantes de La Plata where he became part of the legendary side nicknamed "Los Profesores". In 1931 he scored 31 goals for the team but was beaten to the golden boot by team mate Alberto Zozaya's 33.

In 1933 Scopelli moved to Italy where he played for Roma. During this time he took the Italian citizenship (as oriundo) and played for the Italy national team. In 1936 Scopelli returned to Argentina to play for Racing Club de Avellaneda. In his later career he played for Red Star Paris in France, around the start of the Second World War he moved to neutral territory to play for Belenenses and then Benfica in Portugal. In 1942 Scopelli returned to South America to play for Universidad de Chile.

Managerial career
After retirement he became a manager, coaching many club teams including Club América in Mexico, and Valencia CF Español and Deportivo de La Coruña in Spain, Belenenses Sporting CP and FC Porto in Portugal and Universidad de Chile.

Scopelli was the Sporting CP manager in the inaugural game of European Cup on 4 September 1955 against FK Partizan Belgrade.

Scopelli also coached at international level, with Chile, Portugal and Mexico.

Death
Scopelli died in Mexico City on 22 October 1987, aged 79.

Career statistics

International goals
Scores and results list Argentina's goal tally first, score column indicates score after each Scopelli goal.

See also 
Oriundo

References

External links

1908 births
1987 deaths
Footballers from La Plata
Argentine people of Italian descent
Argentine footballers
Italian footballers
Italy international footballers
Citizens of Italy through descent
Estudiantes de La Plata footballers
A.S. Roma players
Racing Club de Avellaneda footballers
Red Star F.C. players
Racing Club de France Football players
C.F. Os Belenenses players
Serie A players
Ligue 2 players
Universidad de Chile footballers
Expatriate footballers in Chile
Expatriate football managers in Chile
Expatriate football managers in Mexico
Argentina international footballers
Argentine football managers
Argentine expatriate football managers
RC Celta de Vigo managers
Granada CF managers
RCD Espanyol managers
Valencia CF managers
Club América managers
Universidad de Chile managers
FC Porto managers
Sporting CP managers
C.F. Os Belenenses managers
Deportivo de La Coruña managers
Expatriate football managers in Portugal
Expatriate football managers in Spain
Dual internationalists (football)
1930 FIFA World Cup players
Copa América-winning players
Association football forwards